The British Academy Television Craft Awards of 2003 are presented by the British Academy of Film and Television Arts (BAFTA) and were held on 11 May 2003 at The Dorchester, Mayfair, the ceremony was hosted by Alistair McGowan.

Winners and nominees
Winners will be listed first and highlighted in boldface.

Special awards
 Carl Davis

See also
 2003 British Academy Television Awards

References

External links
British Academy Craft Awards official website

2003 television awards
2003 in British television
2003 in British cinema
2003 in London
May 2003 events in the United Kingdom
2003